Tarantella was a  sailing catamaran designed by Nathanael Greene Herreshoff. She was launched in 1877, a year after Herreshoff's smaller catamaran Amaryllis won the 1876 New York Centennial Regatta, which resulted in multihulls being banned from regattas. The Tarantella was  longer than her two patented sisterships Teaser and John Gilpin (measuring approximately 32 feet in length overall). She was eventually exported to the United Kingdom. The brother of her designer described these catamarans as outstanding upwind performers:

See also
List of multihulls
Catamaran
Nathanael Greene Herreshoff

References

Individual catamarans
1877 ships
Sailboat type designs by Nathanael Greene Herreshoff